Ian Epton is a former wrestler from Zambia, which was then the British protectorate of Northern Rhodesia.

He competed at the 1954 British Empire Games, and won a bronze medal for wrestling in the Men's Bantamweight class. In the 1958 British Empire and Commonwealth Games, he won a gold medal for South Africa in the flyweight category.

References

External links
 

Living people
Sportspeople from Edinburgh
Zambian male sport wrestlers
British emigrants to Zambia
Zambian emigrants to South Africa
Wrestlers at the 1954 British Empire and Commonwealth Games
Commonwealth Games bronze medallists for Northern Rhodesia
South African people of Scottish descent
Wrestlers at the 1958 British Empire and Commonwealth Games
Commonwealth Games gold medallists for South Africa
South African male sport wrestlers
Commonwealth Games medallists in wrestling
Year of birth missing (living people)
Medallists at the 1954 British Empire and Commonwealth Games
Medallists at the 1958 British Empire and Commonwealth Games